The Chronicler is the author, or group of authors, to whom biblical scholars have attributed the composition of the Books of Chronicles, the Book of Ezra, and the Book of Nehemiah in the Hebrew Bible. Although these books contain overlapping and sometimes conflicting accounts, "almost all scholars agree that the four books were put together as a continuous story". Scholars believe that the Chronicler worked between 400 and 250 BC, with the period 350–300 BC the most likely.

References 

4th-century BC writers
3rd-century BC writers
Books of Chronicles
Pseudonymous writers
Unidentified people